Natricia Tara Bernard is a choreographer and creative director based in the UK who has worked with many leading artists for over 20 years. After appearing in a commercial at the age of 5, she trained at the Super Arts Stage school for 12 years, completing her training at the London Studio Centre. She has since worked with many big names in the entertainment industry, appearing on television, award shows, modelling, and choreographing for various work including music videos, commercials, television and events.

In 2009, Bernard was awarded companionship by the Liverpool Institute for Performing Arts for her contribution to the world of entertainment, a distinction similar to an honorary degree.

In 2010 she choreographed Katy Perry's "Firework" music video, which won an MTV award for Video of the Year.

Natricia Bernard is represented by Mark Summers in the UK, and Go 2 Talent in Los Angeles.

List of work
A selection of notable productions for which Bernard served as a choreographer and/ or creative director.

Promos

Commercials

Tours & PA's

Other credits
Natricia Bernard was the Movement director for Dizzee Rascal and Florence and the Machine's BRIT Awards performance in 2010, several award show performances by Duffy, and was the associate choreographer on the BBC show Move Like Michael Jackson. In 2009 she was the choreographer for the London castings for Michael Jackson's 2009 This Is It concerts.

In October 2012, Natricia Bernard was at the world premiere of Show Me with the cast of YMA at Friedrichstadt-Palast Berlin Germany. She is one of the choreographers of the show, for which she has choreographed four songs with 60 dancers.

In November 2012, Bernard secretly trained Edinburgh couple Gemma and Darren Tunesi to have them ready to take the floor for the new STV show First Dance and won the £10,000 prize.

References

External links 

Natricia Bernard at Facebook
Natricia Bernard at Twitter

English women choreographers
Living people
Year of birth missing (living people)